Sermitsiaq Island is an uninhabited island in the Sermersooq municipality in southwestern Greenland.

Geography
The two sibling islands are Qeqertarsuaq Island and Qoornuup Qeqertarsua Island. The prominent  Sermitsiaq mountain topping the island is a landmark of Nuuk, visible from most places in the city.

See also
List of islands of Greenland

References 

Uninhabited islands of Greenland